Benny Lennartsson is a Swedish football coach, former football and bandy player.

He has managed Örebro SK, Lyngby FC and Bristol City among others.

Managerial career

Viking
In 1988, Lennartsson signed for Norwegian club Viking FK. He won promotion from the second tier in his first season at the club. The next season, Viking were the winners of the Norwegian Cup by beating Molde in the final. In 1991, he won the first tier of Norwegian football, before leaving the club the same season.

In 2000, Lennartsson joined Viking for a second spell. It would prove to be a successful one, as the club finished in third place in his first two seasons in charge. Viking also got to the final of the Norwegian Cup in both 2000 and 2001, but only winning it in the latter. His last season as manager of Viking, was in 2002. The club finished in 4th place in the league and knocked Chelsea out of the UEFA Cup.

Honours

Viking
Tippeligaen: 1991

2. divisjon: 1988

Norwegian Cup: 1989, 2001

Individual
 Kniksen Award Coach of the Year (1): 1991

References

1943 births
Swedish football managers
Swedish footballers
Sportspeople from Örebro
Living people
Viborg FF managers
Kniksen Award winners
Viking FK managers
Eliteserien managers
Örebro SK players
Fulham F.C. players
Örebro SK managers
IK Start managers
Bristol City F.C. managers
Lyngby Boldklub managers
Swedish expatriate sportspeople in Denmark
Swedish expatriate sportspeople in England
Expatriate football managers in Denmark
Expatriate football managers in England
Swedish expatriate sportspeople in Norway
expatriate football managers in Norway
Swedish expatriate football managers
Association football midfielders
Swedish bandy players
Örebro SK Bandy players